Sengari Dam  is a dam in the Hyōgo Prefecture of Japan.

Dams in Hyogo Prefecture
Dams completed in 1919